The National Institute of Statistics (Portuguese: Instituto Nacional de Estatística, INE) is an agency belonging to the Government of Mozambique and the principal agency for the collection of statistics in the country. It was created under Presidential Decree nº 9/96, of August 28, 1996.

References

Government agencies established in 1996
Government of Mozambique
Mozambique